Amarildo Aparecido de Souza Junior, known simply as Amarildo (born 19 January 1999) is a Brazilian footballer who plays for Pouso Alegre, on loan from Tombense.

Career
Amarildo began his career in the youth ranks of São Paulo. During March 2017 he signed with Red Bull Brasil joining the under 20 side. On 15 August 2018 Amarildo made his first team debut with Red Bull Brasil, appearing in a 1-0 victory over Noroeste in the Copa Paulista.

On 15 March 2019 Amarildo joined New York Red Bulls II on loan from Red Bull Brasil.

In July 2021, he joined Portuguese Primeira Liga club Famalicão.

Career statistics

References

External links
 

1999 births
People from Paranavaí
Sportspeople from Paraná (state)
Living people
Association football forwards
Brazilian footballers
Red Bull Brasil players
New York Red Bulls II players
Maringá Futebol Clube players
Associação Atlética Caldense players
Tombense Futebol Clube players
F.C. Famalicão players
Clube Náutico Capibaribe players
Pouso Alegre Futebol Clube players
USL Championship players
Campeonato Brasileiro Série C players
Primeira Liga players
Campeonato Pernambucano players
Campeonato Brasileiro Série B players
Brazilian expatriate footballers
Expatriate soccer players in the United States
Brazilian expatriate sportspeople in the United States
Expatriate footballers in Portugal
Brazilian expatriate sportspeople in Portugal